Toda una vida (English title:A whole life) is a Mexican telenovela produced by Guillermo Diazayas for Televisa in 1981. Telenovela is inspired by a real historical personage Maria Conessa. It starred by Ofelia Medina, Arturo Alegro, Dolores Beristáin, Georgina Barragán and Delia Casanova.

Cast 
Ofelia Medina as Alejandra Pastora
Arturo Alegro as Salvador Díaz Mirón
Jorge Arvizu as Don Francisco I. Madero
Miguel Ayones as Martín
Georgina Barragán as Genara
Rolando Barral as Rene Racquer
Mary Begoña as Felisa
Dolores Beristáin as Romualda
Delia Casanova as Moravia Castro
Manolo Coego as Don Julián Mauti
Sergio Corona as Pedro de Montejo
Eduardo Fajardo as Arnulfo
María Fernanda as Imperio
Luis García 
Alfonso Iturralde as Joaquín
Evangelina Martínez as Magdalena
José Luis Padilla as Don Porfirio Díaz
Miguel Palmer as Sergio
Armando Pascual as Antonio
Luis Rábago as Ricardo
Conrado San Martín as Roque
Margarita Sanz as Soledad
Miguel Suárez as Ramón
Salvador Sánchez as Lucio
Gonzalo Vega as Eduardo

References

External links

1981 telenovelas
Mexican telenovelas
1981 Mexican television series debuts
1981 Mexican television series endings
Spanish-language telenovelas
Television shows set in Mexico
Televisa telenovelas